Parliamentary elections were held in the Dominican Republic on 16 May 2006. They were won by the Progressive Bloc led by the Dominican Liberation Party, which took 96 of the 178 seats in the Chamber of Deputies and 22 of the 32 Senate seats.

Results

References

Elections in the Dominican Republic
Dominican Republic
Election
May 2006 events in North America